The CPBL MVP of the Year Award is an annual award given to one outstanding player of Chinese Professional Baseball League. The Award has been given since 1993.

List of winners

See also
Baseball awards#Taiwan (Republic of China): Chinese Professional Baseball League (CPBL)

References

Chinese Professional Baseball League lists
Chinese Professional Baseball League awards
Cpbl